Joshua Vincent "Josh" Alcala (born January 5, 1984, in Austin, Texas) is an American–born soccer player of Filipino and Hispanic descent.  He is currently a free agent.

Career

Early career
Alcala grew up in Buda, Texas, attended Hays High School, and played college soccer at the University of South Carolina between 2002 and 2006, where during his senior year he was named the offensive MVP and received first-team honors in Conference USA. Alcala also played in the USL Premier Development League for Austin Lightning.

Professional
Alcala turned professional in December 2006, signing a contract with USL Second Division expansion side Crystal Palace Baltimore. He made 19 appearances, and scored 3 goals for Palace, before leaving the club in October 2007.

In 2008, Alcala decided to join his hometown PDL team, Austin Aztex U23, in preparation for the debut of the senior Austin Aztex USL1 team in 2009. He formally signed for the Aztex on 26 March 2009. He was released by the Aztex at the end of the 2009 season.

References

External links
 SC Gamecocks bio

1984 births
Living people
American sportspeople of Filipino descent
Soccer players from Austin, Texas
Austin Aztex players
Austin Aztex FC players
Austin Aztex U23 players
Austin Lightning players
Crystal Palace Baltimore players
South Carolina Gamecocks men's soccer players
USL First Division players
USL Second Division players
USL League Two players
People from Buda, Texas
Association football forwards
American soccer players